The 2019 Stanley Cup Eastern Conference First Round series between the Tampa Bay Lightning and the Columbus Blue Jackets was a playoff series in the National Hockey League's (NHL) 2018–19 season. The series began on April 10, 2019 and ended on April 16.

The 2018–19 NHL season saw the Tampa Bay Lightning tie the 1995–96 Detroit Red Wings for the most regular season wins in NHL history. The Columbus Blue Jackets came into the series as the eighth seed, finishing with 98 points and qualifying for the playoffs in their second to last game. Tampa Bay won the Presidents' Trophy with 128 points and had beaten Columbus in all three regular season meetings by a combined score of 17 to 3. The Lightning were seen by analysts as the overwhelming favorites to win the series. However, the series ended in a shocking elimination for the Lightning; they blew a 3–0 lead at the end of the first period and lost Game 1, 4–3. The Blue Jackets subsequently won Game 2, 5–1 and, in Columbus, Ohio, won games 3 and 4, 3–1 and 7–3 respectively. The series concluded with Columbus sweeping the Lightning in four games, with a +11 goal differential, while never trailing in the final three games.

The series marked several NHL records. Tampa's elimination was the first time a Presidents' Trophy winner was swept by an eighth seed. It also marked the first time that a Presidents' Trophy winner was eliminated in the first round since 2012, and the fifth time in NHL history that a team with the best regular season record got swept in the First Round (and the first time since the Expansion Era). The Blue Jackets' victory marked their first ever playoff series win in franchise history.

Many commentators consider this series to be one of the greatest upsets in NHL history, considering that the Blue Jackets trailed the Lightning by 30 points exactly during the regular season. Jeremy Roenick of NBC Sports described Tampa's elimination as "one of the biggest letdowns in history", while the Tampa Bay Times described it as "the disappointment that all others are measured against".

The two teams would once again play each other the next year in the first round of the 2020 Stanley Cup playoffs, where the Lightning would avenge the previous year's loss winning that series 4–1 and would eventually go on to win the Stanley Cup. Tampa Bay would go on to win back-to-back Stanley Cups in the 2020 and 2021 Stanley Cup playoffs, and the Lightning would make it back to the Stanley Cup Finals in the 2022 Stanley Cup playoffs.

Background

Columbus Blue Jackets

The Blue Jackets entered the 2018 Stanley Cup playoffs as a wild card qualifier, qualifying in back-to-back years for the first time in franchise history. They faced the Washington Capitals in the first round, winning the first two games in overtime and their first series lead. However, they lost the next four games and the series in six games.

Two-time Vezina Trophy winner Sergei Bobrovsky and the team's leading scorer, Artemi Panarin were in the final year of their contracts before becoming unrestricted free agents. Blue Jackets GM Jarmo Kekalainen was an active participant near the trade deadline window of the 2018–19 season, acquiring several players with expiring contracts. On February 22, the Blue Jackets acquired Matt Duchene in a trade with the Ottawa Senators. A day later, the Blue Jackets traded again with the Senators, this time acquiring Ryan Dzingel in exchange for Anthony Duclair. On February 25, the Blue Jackets acquired Keith Kinkaid from the New Jersey Devils in exchange for a fifth round pick in the 2022 NHL Entry Draft, and later acquired Adam McQuaid from the New York Rangers in exchange for Julius Bergman and fourth and seventh round picks in the 2019 NHL Entry Draft.

Despite these acquisitions, the Blue Jackets initially struggled into March as they faced fierce competition from the Montreal Canadiens and the Carolina Hurricanes for the last two Wild Card spots. They won seven of their last eight games and on April 5, 2019, the Blue Jackets clinched the final playoff spot in the Eastern Conference with a 3–2 shootout win over the New York Rangers.

Tampa Bay Lightning

In the 2018 Stanley Cup playoffs, the Lightning eliminated the New Jersey Devils in the first round and the Boston Bruins in the second round, both in five games. However, they were defeated in the Eastern Conference Finals by the eventual Stanley Cup champions, the Washington Capitals, in seven games.

Prior to the start of the 2018–19 season, it was announced that Steve Yzerman was resigning from his position as GM, and Julien BriseBois took his place. The Lightning clinched their first Presidents' Trophy and second consecutive division title and secured home-ice advantage throughout the playoffs.

The Lightning finished the regular season with 62 wins, tied with the 1995–96 Detroit Red Wings for most wins in a single season in NHL history. They recorded 128 points in the regular season, with a points percentage of .780, the second-highest rate for an 82-game season, behind only the 1995–96 Detroit Red Wings (.799). They were also the highest-scoring team on average (3.89) since the 1995–96 Red Wings and, of their 62 wins, 30 were by a margin of three or more goals, which was tied for the most since 1992–93.

Pivotal to the Lightning's success was their offense led by Steven Stamkos, Brayden Point, and Nikita Kucherov. On March 9, 2019, Kucherov set the Lightning single season record for points in a season with his 109th point of year. Kucherov went on to record his 40th goal of the season on April 5, 2019 and his 126th point, setting the record for most points in an NHL season during the salary cap era, a record formerly held by Joe Thornton. Kucherov ended the season with 128 points (41 goals and 87 assists), surpassing Alexander Mogilny for most points in the NHL by a Russian-born player and winning the Art Ross Trophy. Stamkos and Point also exceeded 40 goals and 90 overall points each by the seasons end.

Game summaries

Team rosters

Columbus Blue Jackets
Updated April 16, 2019

|}

Tampa Bay Lightning
Updated April 16, 2019

 

|}

Reactions

Professional
Prior to Game 4 between the Boston Bruins and the Toronto Maple Leafs, Maple Leafs' forward Zach Hyman expressed shock over the Lightning's exit from the playoffs. "I don't think Columbus is really an eighth seed. They loaded up at the (trade) deadline. They've got some great players. But Tampa set a bunch of records, so it's pretty surprising." Hyman's teammate Travis Dermott acknowledged a difference between the regular season and postseason, but continues to state: "It's kind of crazy to think such a good team in the regular season can go out in four like that. You never really would have thunk it." Bruins head coach Bruce Cassidy acknowledged that every team had a chance, but also admitted that he did not guess the Lightning to fail to win a single game in the series.

Media

The Tampa Bay Times' sports section greeted the Game 3 result with a headline reading "Torturella". When the Blue Jackets' sweep was confirmed, Tampa Bay Times' frontpage headlines read "Fizzled Sticks" and "Floored". The paper savaged the Lightning for their poor play, suggesting their defeat "was the final chapter in a whole new story of despair. In a way, it was as if an entire community was duped. For six months, the Lightning had you believing you were seeing something historic. And in the end, it was all choke and mirrors."

Meanwhile, Columbus paper The Columbus Dispatch heralded the results, with its frontpage headline reading "A Sweep to Savor". Game 4 of the series delivered a household rating of 9.83 for Fox Sports Ohio, the highest-ever ratings for a Blue Jackets telecast. On average, the series delivered an average of 6.48 HH in the Columbus metropolitan area.

The New York Times described the series' result as a playoff meltdown for the Lightning, suggesting that the Lightning could be amongst the biggest playoff underachievers in sports history. USA Today described the Lightning's exit as one of the worst playoff flops in NHL history, while Deadspin stated "[the Lightning] failed to show up in their first-round series against the tremendously underestimated Columbus Blue Jackets, and they paid the price." In an interview on NPR, Greg Wyshynski of ESPN stated the Lightning had to apologize to their fans. Wyshynski went on to state that the only other team in the history of the four major sports leagues in America that failed to win a playoff game after equivalent levels of regular season success was the 2011 Green Bay Packers. "But in [the Packers'] case, we're talking about one game. [The Lightning] is a team that had four chances to win a game, and they couldn't do it."
 
In Canada, Rory Boylen of Sportsnet described the series as the biggest upset in the salary cap era of the NHL. He postulated that the result may be a culmination of how the Lightning got eliminated in recent seasons, going as far back as their First Round loss in the 2014 Stanley Cup Playoffs against the Montreal Canadiens. In his words, "time will tell if these Lightning are like the San Jose Sharks – a squad that seemed to have everything in place for years and even got to one Stanley Cup Final, but could never win it all – or if they'll eventually put it together for a successful run as Washington [Capitals] did last season."

Financial
WFTS-TV reported that the city of Tampa could lose up to $50 million in potential revenue as a result of the sweep. Conversely, in Columbus, merchandise sales tripled as a result of the Blue Jackets' surprise series win.

See also
2023 Fairleigh Dickinson vs. Purdue men's basketball game, the second time a 16-seed beat a 1-seed in men's college basketball, held at Nationwide Arena
Miracle on Ice
Miracle on Manchester

References

External links
 Lightning vs Blue Jackets series at NHL.com

Tampa Bay Lightning–Columbus Blue Jackets playoff series
Stanley Cup playoff games
Tampa Bay Lightning games
Columbus Blue Jackets games
Ice hockey competitions in Florida
Ice hockey competitions in Ohio
Tampa Bay Lightning–Columbus Blue Jackets playoff series
Tampa Bay Lightning–Columbus Blue Jackets playoff series
Tampa Bay Lightning–Columbus Blue Jackets playoff series